Amir Beg Armani was a 17th-century Safavid official, courtier, and gholam of Armenian origin. He served during the reign of the kings Safi (r. 1629–1642) and Abbas II (r. 1642–1666), and functioned as the royal sommelier (shirehchi-bashi) for several years, as well as governor (hakem) of Gaskar (1633-1643).

Amir Beg Armani was given the governorship of Gaskar after his predecessor, Manuchehr Khan, became a victim of king Safi's purges, who had just recently ascended the throne. He had a son named Safiqoli, who succeeded him as the shirehchi-bashi.

Sources
 
  
 
 
 

17th-century deaths
Persian Armenians
Safavid ghilman
Safavid governors in Gilan
Ethnic Armenian Shia Muslims
Converts to Shia Islam from Christianity
Armenian former Christians
17th-century people of Safavid Iran
Safavid slaves